Cervo Valley (in Italian Valle Cervo or Valle di Andorno, in Piedmontese Val d'Andorn or Bürsch) is a valley in north-east of Piedmont in the Province of Biella, Italy.

Etymology
The valley takes its name from Cervo, a right-hand tributary of the Sesia which flows through the valley.
It is also called Valle di Andorno from Andorno Micca, a town which lies in the main valley near its exit on the Po plain.

Geography
Besides Andorno other municipalities of the area are Biella, Campiglia Cervo, Miagliano, Piedicavallo, Pralungo, Quittengo, Rosazza, Sagliano Micca, San Paolo Cervo, Tavigliano and Tollegno.

Notable summits
Among the notable summits which surround the valley (all belonging to the Biellese Alps) there are:

 Monte Bo - 2.556 m 
 Monte Cresto - 2.548 m 
 Punta Tre Vescovi - 2.501 m 
 Monte Pietra Bianca - 2.490 m
 Gemelli di Mologna - 2.476 m

See also
 Biellese Alps

Notes and references

External links

 http://www.vallecervo.it/ 

Valleys of Piedmont
Valleys of the Alps
Province of Biella
Biellese Alps